The Lincoln Mark VIII is a grand touring luxury coupe marketed by Lincoln from the 1993 to 1998 model years over a single generation, manufactured at Ford's Wixom Assembly Plant. Succeeding the Lincoln Mark VII, the Mark VIII shared underpinnings with the Ford Thunderbird and Mercury Cougar.

Following the 1998 model year, the Mark VIII was discontinued without replacement, remaining the last model of the Lincoln Mark series.

Development

Development of the Mark VIII (FN-10) began in 1984 with a projected release for the 1990 model year. Design work began in 1986 and was oriented toward evolutionary changes. By 1987, Lincoln designers emphasized  interior design, as ordered by then Ford design director Dave Rees. In the autumn of 1988, FN-10 development was pushed and went through several revisions. This was done to further develop a more precise product to accommodate the use of a DOHC modular engine, using the upcoming MN12 platform due to be launched in December 1988.

Having seen designs of upcoming models from competitors, Ford ordered a radical redesign, a departure from any previous Lincolns, while retaining styling cues. By November 1988, under Ford designer Kyu Kim, Ford presented a design named "Stretch I", featuring scalloped sides, full length taillights, the spare-tire hump, waterfall grille, small C-pillars, a full-length headlight setup, two air inlets on the front bumper, taillights that flowed upward on the sides rather than downward on the production car —  and devoid of chrome. A clay mockup of Stretch I was finalized within four weeks.

"Stretch I" was shown in 1:1 scale in clay to Lincoln executives on December 12, 1988. Appalled by the design, the executives ordered several changes to the exterior. As a result, "Stretch II" was created during early 1989, by adding chrome in several places and moderately revising the front and rear end treatments.  Stretch II represented about 70 percent of the finished product, with details revised up to mid-1989. The final design freeze of the FN-10 Mark VIII occurred, scheduled for an April 1992 start of production and June 1992 launch as a 1993 model year vehicle.

FN-10 prototype mules in modified Ford Thunderbird and Mercury Cougar bodies began road-testing in 1990. Full-body prototypes later commenced road-testing in the first half of 1991. In February 1991, launch was delayed by 6 months to December 1992. The 1993 Mark VIII was unveiled by the press in March 1992 and officially introduced to the public on November 18, 1992, at a Hotel Mark in New York City. Production of the 1992 Mark VII ended at the Wixom Plant in April 1992 to facilitate retooling for October production commencement of the Mark VIII.

Model History

The 1993 Mark VIII was a larger car than its predecessor, being about five inches longer and nearly four inches wider than the Mark VII.

The Mark VIII featured unibody construction with a high-strength roof, heavy-gauge steel door beams to protect against side impacts, front and rear crumple zones, dual front-side airbags, and four-wheel antilock disc brakes. It also featured a short-long arm (SLA) four-wheel independent suspension with front and rear stabilizer bars and a standard computer-controlled air suspension with sensors to automatically lower the ride height at high speed, enhancing the car's aerodynamics. Powering the Mark VIII was an all-new, all-aluminum  DOHC 32-valve V8. The engine was the first of its kind in Ford's Modular engine family. Handling the V8's power was the 4R70W 4-speed automatic transmission with overdrive. The Mark VIII's rear axle ratio was 3.08:1. Also featured were standard chrome dual exhaust tips and 16-inch cast aluminum wheels.

The Mark VIII uses a 140-mph speedometer, an electronic message center (giving time, compass heading, fuel efficiency, engine oil life, and various other vehicle-related warnings and information), automatic climate control, cruise control, leather seating surfaces, six-way power driver and passenger seats with power lumbar supports, a two-position memory for the power driver's seat, power door locks, heated power mirrors, power windows with a driver's-side express-down feature, illuminated keyless entry with remote, automatic headlamps, an AM/FM stereo-cassette radio, and an automatic power antenna. Options included a power moonroof, electrochromic automatic dimming mirrors (which filtered out headlight glare from behind), an AM/FM stereo-CD player, a 10-disc CD changer, and a JBL speaker system.

For 1995, the Mark VIII received a slightly updated instrument panel along with a new radio design. Arriving midyear was a new LSC (Luxury Sport Coupe) model. The Mark VIII LSC used the same 4R70W automatic transmission as the standard Mark VIII, but featured a more aggressive rear axle ratio of 3.27:1. The brochure for the 1995 Lincoln Mark VIII LSC claims a  acceleration time of 7.5 seconds. The LSC featured unique body colors, distinct rear decklid badging, perforated leather seat inserts, and floor mats. The bright chrome inserts normally found in the body-side moulding and bumper on the Mark VIII were replaced with monochrome body color inserts on the LSC. The 1995 Mark VIII LSC also marked the first domestic use of HID headlights.

A Diamond Anniversary package was offered on the 1996 Mark VIII to commemorate Lincoln's 75th anniversary.  It featured "Diamond Anniversary" badging, leather seats, voice-activated cellular phone, JBL audio system, auto electrochromatic dimming mirror with compass, and traction control.

Facelift (1997–1998)

Development of an updated FN-10 began in 1993, with a design freeze occurring in November 1994. The first prototypes were built in September 1995, testing into mid-1996. In September 1996, Alcan Aluminum Limited won a bid to supply hoods for the revised FN-10. In the fall of 1996, the Mark VIII received a significant facelift since its 1992 debut, featuring smoother, more rounded front and rear fascias and a larger grille. The car's hood was now aluminum (versus plastic before) and the trunk carried a more subtle version of the "spare tire hump" associated with earlier Mark Series cars. HID headlamps became standard and were placed in larger housings compared to earlier models. A neon brake light ran across the rear decklid. Side mirrors now came with puddle lamps, which, upon unlocking the doors, illuminated the ground for the driver and passengers to see when entering the car. The side-view mirror housings also incorporated flashing LED turn signal lamps to warn other drivers of an intended lane change or turn. The interior included 'theater lighting', which softly illuminated the driver's controls and handles. The  InTech V8 carried on as before, but now came with a distributorless coil-on-plug ignition system, eliminating the use of high-voltage spark plug wires. Some of the internal components of the 4R70W automatic transmission were reinforced for greater durability and reliability in late 1997 models and all 1998 models. LSC models had firmer shocks and larger stabilizer bars for even better handling and control. All-speed traction control was now standard, and could be deactivated via the onboard systems status computer when desired.

Toward the end of Mark VIII production, Lincoln offered two personalized "specialty" models: the Spring Feature and the Collector's Edition. Mark VIII production ended with the 1998 model year. The new four-door mid-sized Lincoln LS, introduced June 1999 as a 2000 model, served as a replacement for the Mark VIII.

Production

References

External links 

 MarkVIII.org One of the original sites dedicated to the Lincoln Mark VIII. Active message board to help with troubleshooting, and classified for parts and cars.
 Mark VIII facts
 Lincoln vs Cadillac Forums One of the largest and most active Forums with a strong Lincoln Mark VIII owner following. Many "DIY How To" articles as well.
 Lincoln Mark VIII Enthusiast Community One of the newesy groups dedicated to the Lincoln Mark VIII. Active posts for help with troubleshooting, and classified for parts and cars.

Cars introduced in 1993
Rear-wheel-drive vehicles
Luxury vehicles
Coupés
Mark 8
Personal luxury cars